Jamal Willer (born 6 March 1994) is a footballer who plays for the Montserrat national football team.

International career

International goals
Score and Result list Montserrat's goals tally first

|-
| 1. || 1 April 2015 || Blakes Estate Stadium, Look Out, Montserrat ||  ||  ||  || 2018 FIFA World Cup qualification || 
|}

References

 
 

1994 births
Living people
Montserratian footballers
Montserrat international footballers
English footballers
English people of Montserratian descent
Hastings United F.C. players
Charlton Athletic F.C. players
Association football midfielders